Everett Lawrence Rowan (October 18, 1902 – November 9, 1956) was an American football end who played three seasons in the National Football League with the Brooklyn Dodgers and Philadelphia Eagles. He played college football at Ohio State University and attended Chillicothe High School in Chillicothe, Ohio.

Professional career

Brooklyn Dodgers
Rowan played in two games for the Brooklyn Dodgers in 1930 and appeared in eleven games, starting nine, for the team during the 1932 season.

Philadelphia Eagles
Rowan played in two games, starting one, for the Philadelphia Eagles in 1933.

Personal life
Rowan died of a heart attack at his home in La Mesa, California on November 9, 1956.

References

External links
Just Sports Stats

1902 births
1956 deaths
Players of American football from Ohio
American football ends
Ohio State Buckeyes football players
Brooklyn Dodgers (NFL) players
Philadelphia Eagles players
Sportspeople from Chillicothe, Ohio